Walgreens Boots Alliance, Inc. is a British-American-Swiss holding company headquartered in Deerfield, Illinois, that owns the retail pharmacy chains Walgreens in the US and Boots in the UK, as well as several pharmaceutical manufacturing and distribution companies. The company was formed on December 31, 2014, after Walgreens purchased the 55% stake in Alliance Boots that it did not already own. The total price of the acquisition was $4.9 billion in cash and 144.3 million common shares with fair value of $10.7 billion. Walgreens had previously purchased 45% of the company for $4.0 billion and 83.4 million common shares in August 2012 with an option to purchase the remaining shares within three years. Walgreens became a subsidiary of the newly created company after the transactions were completed. As of 2022, Walgreens Boots Alliance is ranked #18 on the Fortune 500 rankings of the largest United States corporations by total revenue.

In fiscal year 2022, the company saw sales of $132.7 billion, up 0.1% from fiscal 2021, and saw net earnings increase to $4.3 billion. The combined business has operations in 9 countries, as of August 31, 2022. Walgreens had formerly operated solely within the United States and its territories, while Alliance Boots operated a more multinational business.

The company began trading on the NASDAQ on December 31, 2014, under the symbol WBA. On June 26, 2018, Walgreens Boots Alliance replaced General Electric on the Dow Jones Industrial Index. The company is also a component of the Nasdaq-100, the S&P 100 and the S&P 500 indices.

Operations

Retail Pharmacy USA

Walgreens and Duane Reade operate within the Retail Pharmacy USA division of Walgreens Boots Alliance. Both businesses sell prescription and non-prescription drugs, and a range of household items, including personal care and beauty products. Walgreens provides access to consumer goods and services, plus pharmacy, photo department, health and wellness services in the United States through its retail drugstores. The division has 9,021 drugstores as of August 31, 2020. 

Walgreens has stores in all 50 US states, the District of Columbia, Puerto Rico, and the U.S. Virgin Islands.

On October 27, 2015, Walgreens announced the purchase of competitor Rite Aid for $17.2 billion. However, that deal was later scrapped due to antitrust concerns in favor of a $5.18 billion deal, in which Walgreens only acquired half of Rite Aid locations.

On September 19, 2017, the Federal Trade Commission (FTC) approved a fourth deal agreement to purchase 1,932 Rite Aid stores for $4.38 billion total, a transaction which was completed in January 2018.

Retail Pharmacy International

Boots forms the main part of the Retail Pharmacy International division of the company. The Boots brand has a history stretching back over 170 years in the United Kingdom (UK) and is a familiar sight on Britain's high streets. Stores are located in prominent high street and city center locations as well as in local communities. Most branches include a pharmacy and focus on healthcare, personal care, and cosmetic products, with most stores selling over-the-counter medicines. Larger stores typically offer a variety of healthcare services in addition to dispensing prescriptions, and chlamydia testing and treatment (private service). Optician services are also offered in many larger stores, with Boots Opticians providing eye tests along with the sale of spectacles and contact lenses.  
Many stores also feature traditional photo processing and/or a Cewe picture kiosk where users of digital cameras and camera phones can create prints via Bluetooth, USB, or CD.  Larger stores usually offer a range of electrical equipment such as hairdryers, curlers, and foot massagers, while selected stores offer a range of sandwiches, baguettes, wraps, salads, and beverages.

Since 1936, there have been Boots stores outside the UK. Stores in countries as widely spread as New Zealand, Canada (see Pharma Plus), and France were all closed in the 1980s. As of 2022 there are Boots-branded stores outside the UK in Ireland and Thailand with Boots franchise operations in the Middle East and Indonesia.

The remainder of the division is made up of the pharmacies Benavides in Mexico and Farmacias Ahumada (FASA) in Chile.

Former operations

With the acquisition of Alliance Boots, the company gained a pharmaceutical wholesale division, operating twice-daily deliveries to more than 16,500 delivery points in the UK alone. Internationally, the Pharmaceutical Wholesale Division, which mainly operated under the Alliance Healthcare brand, supplied medicines, other healthcare products and related services to more than 115,000 pharmacies, doctors, health centers and hospitals each year from 306 distribution centers in 11 countries.

In June 2021, the majority of the Alliance Healthcare wholesale division was sold to AmerisourceBergen for $6.275bn in cash.

Finances 
For the fiscal year 2020, Walgreens Boots Alliance reported earnings of US$456 million, with an annual revenue of US$139.5 billion, an increase of 2.5% over the previous fiscal cycle. Numbers before 2014 are for Walgreens only. As of 2022, Walgreens Boots Alliance is ranked #18 on the Fortune 500 rankings of the largest United States corporations by total revenue.

Product brands
Boots produces a large number of brands, including No. 7, Soltan and Botanics, Boots Pharmaceuticals, and Boots Laboratories, that Alliance Boots and Walgreens sought to launch internationally following the first share purchase in 2012.

Launched in 1935, the No. 7 brand is best known for its anti-aging beauty serums, developed in Nottingham. The range comprises products designed to target the aging concerns of specific age groups. No. 7 became available in Walgreens and Duane Reade stores in the US from November 2012, beginning in Los Angeles.

Launched in 1939, Soltan markets its UVA 5-star suncare protection, a standard of protection developed by Boots and now adopted as the benchmark for suncare products in the UK. However, in both 2004 and 2015, Watchdog, a BBC consumer investigative TV program and cited on BBC News, plus the consumer Which? magazine, each did an investigation finding the 5-star rating was unsubstantiated, and skincare experts declared it to be far less safe than claimed.

First launched in 1995, the Botanics range, developed in partnership with the Royal Botanic Gardens, Kew, uses plant extracts in a variety of products and includes a range of organic products. The Boots Botanics range is also available through third party retailers.

The Boots own brand range of products includes skincare, medicines, healthcare products, and many more. Boots Laboratories skincare range for independent pharmacy customers was launched in France and Portugal in 2008/09 and is also sold in Spain, Italy, and Germany.

Boots now owns Almus Pharmaceuticals, a brand of generic prescription drugs, launched in 2003. It is now sold in five countries and is an umbrella brand for a wide range of lower cost generic medicines. Almus placed considerable emphasis on the design of the packaging in an attempt to reduce the number of errors by the dispensing chemist and by the patient relating to incorrect dosage which can result in either a dangerous accidental overdose or an equally dangerous under dose.

Walgreens has a self-branded line of products, "Well at Walgreens".

In 2015, Walgreens Boots Alliance paid £140 million (about $250 million) for UK skincare brand Liz Earle Naturally Active, an Avon Products subsidiary since 2010. Liz Earle Beauty Co co-founder Liz Earle, 'one of the biggest names in the beauty industry' stayed on as an 'ambassador' after selling the company for an undisclosed sum and told her own Liz Earle Wellbeing magazine's website that '...alongside my new digital and print publishing venture...at the moment I'm still connected to Liz Earle Beauty Co and continue to work as a consultant to the brand that carries my name. I'm involved in new product development...'  In 2012, Liz Earle announced that she had left the company.

References

External links
 

 
American companies established in 2014
Holding companies of the United States
Multinational companies headquartered in the United States
Holding companies established in 2014
Companies listed on the Nasdaq
Companies based in Deerfield, Illinois
Health care companies based in Illinois
Specialty drugs
Companies in the Dow Jones Industrial Average
2014 mergers and acquisitions